Sclerophrys camerunensis is a species of toad in the family Bufonidae. It is found in southeastern Nigeria, southern Cameroon, Equatorial Guinea (including the island of Bioko), Gabon, the Central African Republic, and the Democratic Republic of the Congo. The record from southwestern Tanzania is uncertain. It is presumed to occur in the Republic of the Congo. Records from West Africa (other than southeastern Nigeria) probably refer to Sclerophrys togoensis. Common names Cameroon toad and Oban toad have been coined for this species.

It can also occur secondary brush. Breeding takes place in lakes, ponds, and very slow-flowing creeks in poorly drained forest. It is a very common species that is not threatened overall, although it probably can suffer locally from forest loss. It occurs in a number of protected areas.

References

camerunensis
Frogs of Africa
Amphibians of West Africa
Amphibians of Cameroon
Amphibians of the Central African Republic
Amphibians of the Democratic Republic of the Congo
Amphibians of Equatorial Guinea
Amphibians of Gabon
Fauna of Nigeria
Amphibians of Tanzania
Amphibians described in 1936
Taxa named by Hampton Wildman Parker
Taxonomy articles created by Polbot